Richard Louis Ormond CBE (born 16 January 1939) is the former Director of the National Maritime Museum (1986–2000). He was also the Assistant Keeper and late Deputy Director of the National Portrait Gallery. He is currently the Chairman of the Trustees of the Watts Gallery. He is also the Chairman of the Friends of Leighton House and a trustee of the Mariners Museum in Newport News, Virginia. He is also an author and biographer.

Biography 
Richard Louis Ormond is the son of Henri Eric Conrad Ormond (1898–1979), who was the second husband of Dorethea Charlotte Gibbons; they married in 1934. She was the daughter of Sir Alexander Doran Gibbons, 7th Bt. In 1963 Richard Louis Ormond married Leonee Jasper. She was one of the Directors of Apsley House. Ormond is the grandson of Violet Sargent Ormond, sister of John Singer Sargent.

References

Links 
National Portrait Gallery
The Times of London. 2000 Honors List

Living people
1939 births
Directors of the National Maritime Museum
British art historians
Commanders of the Order of the British Empire